Deiniol Jones (born 18 November 1977) is a Welsh former professional rugby union player who played as a lock. Born in Carmarthen, he played for the Carmarthen Quins youth team before moving to study chemistry at the University of Bath in 1997. There, he was picked up by English Premiership side Bath RFC, where he played for three years before a loan move back to Wales with Ebbw Vale. In 2001, he made a permanent move to Bridgend, and two years later he was signed by the newly formed, Bridgend-based regional side Celtic Warriors. The Warriors only lasted one year before folding, after which Jones moved to Cardiff Blues.

Jones became the first player to make 100 appearances for the Blues in a match against Connacht in May 2008. He played for the Blues for eight years before his retirement from playing due to a shoulder injury in April 2012, making his last appearance in another game against Connacht in October 2011.

Jones made one appearance for the Barbarians in January 2009, in the official opening match for the Scarlets' new stadium, Parc y Scarlets. The Scarlets won the match 40–24.

Jones made his Wales debut on 11 November 2000 against Samoa.

In July 2012, Jones was appointed the match-day team manager of Cardiff Blues.

Jones is a fluent Welsh speaker.

References

External links
Cardiff Blues profile
Wales profile
ERC Rugby profile

1977 births
Rugby union players from Carmarthen
Living people
Rugby union locks
Welsh rugby union players
Wales international rugby union players
Bath Rugby players
Ebbw Vale RFC players
Bridgend RFC players
Cardiff Rugby players